RC Paris won Division 1 season 1935/1936 of the French Association Football League with 44 points.

Participating teams

 Olympique Alès
 FC Antibes
 AS Cannes
 SC Fives
 Olympique Lillois
 Olympique de Marseille
 FC Metz
 FC Mulhouse
 RC Paris
 Red Star Olympique
 Stade Rennais UC
 Excelsior AC Roubaix
 FC Sète
 FC Sochaux-Montbéliard
 RC Strasbourg
 US Valenciennes-Anzin

Final table

Promoted from Division 2, who will play in Division 1 season 1936/1937:
 FC Rouen: Champion of Division 2
 RC Roubaix: Runner-up Division 2

Results

Top goalscorers

Players used

References
 Division 1 season 1935-1936 at pari-et-gagne.com

Ligue 1 seasons
France
1